Teréz Bednarik (born 20 July 1957) is a Hungarian rower. She competed in the women's coxless pair event at the 1980 Summer Olympics.

References

External links
 

1957 births
Living people
Hungarian female rowers
Olympic rowers of Hungary
Rowers at the 1980 Summer Olympics
Sportspeople from Pest County